Minamestane (INN (former developmental code name FCE-24,928) is a steroidal aromatase inhibitor which was under development by Farmitalia-Carlo Erba as an antineoplastic agent in the mid-1990s but was never marketed.

Unlike other steroidal aromatase inhibitors such as formestane and exemestane, minamestane does not have androgenic properties.

See also
 Plomestane

References

Androstanes
Antiestrogens
Aromatase inhibitors
Hormonal antineoplastic drugs